Lida is an air base of the Air Force and Air Defence Forces of the Republic of Belarus located Lida, Grodno Region, Belarus.

It is home to the 116th Guards Assault Aviation Base, flying Sukhoi Su-25s and Yak-130s alongside the 206th Training Center for Aircrew with Aero L-39C Albatroses.

The 277th Bomber Aviation Regiment of the Russian Air Force with Sukhoi Su-24's from Komsomolsk-on-Amur Airport deployed here as part of the 2022 Russian invasion of Ukraine.

References

Belarusian Air Force
Grodno Region